Marian Babirecki (18 January 1933 – 5 June 1980) was a Polish equestrian. He competed in two events at the 1960 Summer Olympics.

References

External links
 

1933 births
1980 deaths
Polish male equestrians
Olympic equestrians of Poland
Equestrians at the 1960 Summer Olympics
Sportspeople from Ternopil
People from Tarnopol Voivodeship
20th-century Polish people